Ayyampalayam village, Kavindapadi post, is a small village of less than 1500 inhabitants, situated in the Bhavani taluk, Erode district in Tamil Nadu.

This village is a part of Kavindapadi Revenue village. And agriculture is the primary business.

Here, they are cultivating coconuts, Paddy, Sugarcane and Turmeric. these are the main crops grown in Ayyampalayam.

The nearest big village is Kavindapadi. Other variants of the spelling may include Kavundhapadi/ Kavundapadi.

Neighborhoods

 Chithode
 Nasiyanur
 Thingalur
 Kanjikoil
 Kavindapadi
 Bhavani
 Lakshmi Nagar
 Komarapalayam
 Erode
 Perundurai
 Gobichettipalayam
 Sathyamangalam
 Othakudirai

Notable people
Former Chief Justice of Chhattisgarh High Court - Ayyampalayam Somasundaram Venkatachala Moorthy. He was also the Head of the Tamil Nadu SHRC from 2006 -2011

References 
 Justice A S Venkatachalamoorthy Appointed Chief Justice of Chhattisgarh High Court
 Justice A.S Venkatachalamoorthy Appointed as Chairman of SHRC
 Former judges at the High Court
 Bhavani Taluk of Erode District

Villages in Erode district